Košarkaški klub Metalac, commonly referred to as KK Metalac, is a men's professional basketball club based in Valjevo, Serbia. They are currently competing in the Basketball League of Serbia.

History
Metalac was established on 24 March 1948 as KK Budućnost Valjevo. Six days later, the club played its first official game in Čačak against Borac and lost 69:19. In a relatively short period of time, they managed to qualify for a higher level of competition, entering the South Group of a then minor Serbian League under the new name Metalac in 1954. Due to financial problems in 1960, the club had to leave all competitions and restart from scratch again a year after.

In 1973 Metalac managed to qualify for the First Yugoslav Federal League by beating Mladost Zemun in the last round of the competition, gaining a decisive advantage over Vojvodina Novi Sad. In the last round Luka Vidacic from Herceg-Novi scored a club record of 57 points. Metalac spent six consecutive seasons in the First League and managed to beat at least once all the big clubs of Yugoslav basketball in that period. They played their last game in Yugoslav First Federal League on 31 March 1979 against Jugoplastika in Split.

During the last couple of years, professional basketball in Valjevo is on the rise again. Metalac qualified for the top level of club competition in Serbia in 2007–08 and since then managed to progress to the Basketball League of Serbia Superleague phase five times. They have constantly been a serious contender for a spot in the Adriatic League over the past few seasons and finally became part of it in 2014–15 after Radnički Kragujevac opted out because of financial instability.

The club was a founding member of the Adriatic Basketball Association in 2015. In December 2020, the club's shares were transferred to FMP.

Sponsorship naming
The club has had several denominations through the years due to its sponsorship:
 Metalac Family One: 1992–1993
 Big Enex Metalac: 1993–1995
 Metalac Koteks: 2012–2013
 Metalac Farmakom: 2013–2016

Players

Current roster

Head coaches

 
 Čedomir Vidaković (1954–1955)
 Luka Stančić (1960–1974)
 Dragoljub Pljakić (1976–1977)
 Luka Stančić (1980–1985)
 Zoran Kovačević (1985–1987)
 Luka Stančić (1987–1988)
 Luka Stančić (1989–1990)
 Mihailo Poček (1990–1992)
 Dragomir Nikitović (1992)
 Zoran Kovačević (1992–1993)
 Vojislav Kecojević (1993–1995)
 Dragan Simeunović (2005–2008)
 Vlade Đurović (2008–2009)
 Aleksandar Icić (2009)
 Milovan Stepandić (2009–2010)
 Velimir Gašić (2010)
 Milovan Stepandić (2010–2011)
 Boško Đokić (2011–2012)
 Dragan Nikolić (2012–2013)
 Milovan Stepandić (2013)
 Siniša Matić (2013–2014)
 Vladimir Đokić (2014–2016)
 Mihailo Poček (2016–2019)
 Vladimir Đokić (2019–2021)
 Branislav Ratkovica (2021–present)

Notable players

  Stefan Birčević
  Petar Božić
  Vukašin Aleksić
  Zlatko Bolić
  Duško Bunić
  Marko Čakarević
  Vladimir Đokić
  Mile Ilić
  Marko Ljubičić
  Aleksandar Mitrović
  Petar Popović
  Stefan Sinovec
  Kimani Ffriend
  Marko Dujković
  Bojan Bakić
  Vladimir Dašić
  Ivan Maraš
  Slavko Vraneš
  Reggie Freeman
  Ashton Mitchell
  Renaldo Woolridge

References

External links
  

Metalac Valjevo
Sport in Valjevo
Basketball teams in Yugoslavia
Basketball teams established in 1948